Lacchiarella is a comune (municipality) in the Metropolitan City of Milan in the Italian region Lombardy, located about  south of Milan.  
 
Lacchiarella borders the following municipalities: Zibido San Giacomo, Pieve Emanuele, Basiglio, Binasco, Bornasco, Siziano, Casarile, Vidigulfo, Giussago.

It is served by Villamaggiore railway station.

References

External links
 Official website

Cities and towns in Lombardy